This is the electoral history of Kamala Harris, the 49th and current vice president of the United States. She previously served as a United States senator from California (2017-2021), the 32nd Attorney General of California (2011-2017), and the 27th District Attorney of San Francisco (2004-2011). A Democrat, Harris was a candidate in the 2020 Democratic Party presidential primaries, but withdrew her candidacy on December 3, 2019 citing a lack of funds. 

On March 8, 2020, Harris endorsed former vice president Joe Biden. Harris was chosen by Biden to be his running mate on August 11, 2020. Biden and Harris went on to win the 2020 general election. On January 20, 2021, Harris would become first female vice president and the highest-ranking female official in U.S. history, as well as the first African American, and first Asian American Vice President of the United States.

San Francisco District Attorney elections

2003

2007

California Attorney General elections

2010

2014

United States Senate elections

2016

Presidential elections

2020

See also

 Electoral history of Joe Biden
 Electoral history of Barack Obama
 Electoral history of Hillary Clinton
 Electoral history of Al Gore
 Electoral history of John McCain
 Electoral history of Donald Trump
 Electoral history of Bernie Sanders
 Electoral history of Mitt Romney

References 

Electoral history
Electoral history of politicians from California
Electoral history of 2020 presidential candidates